Pedro Acosta Sánchez (born 25 May 2004) is a Spanish Grand Prix motorcycle racer, competing in Moto2 for the Red Bull KTM Ajo team. He is best known for winning the 2021 Moto3 World Championship in his first year, becoming the first rookie champion since Loris Capirossi in 1990, and the second youngest ever champion, just one day older than Capirossi was at the time of winning. Acosta is also a champion of the Red Bull MotoGP Rookies Cup, having won the title in 2020.

Career

Early career
Acosta participated in various national competitions, winning in 2017 in the PreMoto3 category. In 2018 he entered the Junior Moto3 World Championship. In 2019 he also raced in the Red Bull MotoGP Rookies Cup, finishing second, winning three races. He finished as champion the following year, winning six races in total, all six coming consecutively at the first six races of the season.

Moto3 World Championship
In  he made his debut racing in Moto3 class with the Red Bull KTM Ajo team. In his first race in Qatar, he finished in second place, becoming one of just a handful of riders to score a podium on their Grand Prix debut. On 4 April 2021 he won the Doha Motorcycle Grand Prix starting from pitlane, becoming the first rider in the history of Moto3 to accomplish this feat. Acosta would later win the next two races in Portugal and Spain, becoming the first rider in Grand Prix history to get on the podium in all of his first four races. He would win three more races during the season, in Germany, Styria, and Algarve, becoming champion in Algarve, when Darryn Binder crashed into Acosta's main title rival Dennis Foggia. He won the championship by 43 points, and became the first rookie champion of the Moto3 class since 1990, when Loris Capirossi won the 125cc title. Acosta was only one day older (17 years, 166 days) than Capirossi (17 years, 165 days) when they won their respective titles.

Moto2 World Championship

Red Bull KTM Ajo (2022–)
Acosta was promoted to Moto2 with the same team in 2022, joining compatriot Augusto Fernández who also moved from Marc VDS Racing Team. He recorded his first Moto2 win during the Italian Grand Prix in Mugello. After missing two rounds due to a broken femur sustained in a training accident, he won another race in Aragón.

Career statistics

FIM CEV Moto3 Junior World Championship

Races by year
(key) (Races in bold indicate pole position, races in italics indicate fastest lap)

Red Bull MotoGP Rookies Cup

Races by year
(key) (Races in bold indicate pole position; races in italics indicate fastest lap)

Grand Prix motorcycle racing

By season

By class

Races by year
(key) (Races in bold indicate pole position, races in italics indicate fastest lap)

References

External links

2004 births
Living people
Moto3 World Championship riders
Spanish motorcycle racers
People from Mazarrón
Moto2 World Championship riders
Sportspeople from the Region of Murcia
Moto3 World Riders' Champions